Éric Leblacher (born 21 March 1978 in Meaux) is a French former cyclist.

Major results

2002
 1st Stage 4 Circuit des Ardennes
2003
 8th Tour du Doubs
 10th Boucles de l'Aulne
2004
 4th Overall Tour of Britain
 6th Polynormande
 8th Tour du Doubs
2006
 1st Stage 3 Étoile de Bessèges
 4th Paris–Camembert
 5th Tour du Doubs

Grand Tour general classification results timeline

References

1978 births
Living people
French male cyclists
People from Meaux
Sportspeople from Seine-et-Marne
Cyclists from Île-de-France